The Queens cocktail is a variant on the perfect martini, with the addition of pineapple juice and sometimes lemon juice. Its closest relative is the more popular Bronx, which contains orange juice rather than pineapple.

It can be found as early as 1930, in Harry Craddock's Savoy Cocktail Book; Craddock's text lists it as a "Queen's Cocktail".

See also
 List of cocktails

References

Cocktails with gin
Cocktails with vermouth